Take Me as I Am is the debut studio album by American country music singer Faith Hill, released in 1993 by Warner Bros. Records. It has been certified 3× platinum in the United States for shipments of three million copies.

Four singles were released from the album. The first two — "Wild One" and "Piece of My Heart" — reached No. 1 on the Billboard Hot Country Singles & Tracks chart in 1994. "Wild One," the tale of a rebellious teen-aged girl in conflict with her parents' more conservative ways, was the lead-off single, spending four weeks at No. 1 that January.

"Piece of My Heart", a cover of the 1967 song by Erma Franklin, was issued as the follow-up. The third single, "But I Will", failed to break the Top 30, but Hill's fourth release in late 1994 (the title track) reached No. 2. 

Larry Flick from Billboard stated that on "But I Will", "the power of her pliable, pure country voice has never been better showcased than on this heartfelt ballad about a woman who's had just about enough."

Track listing
All tracks produced by Scott Hendricks; except "Just Around the Eyes" produced by Michael Clute and Gary Burr.

Personnel
As listed in liner notes.

All tracks except "Just Around the Eyes"
Gary Burr – background vocals
John Catchings – cello
Bill Cuomo – synthesizer
Stuart Duncan – mandolin, fiddle
Paul Franklin – steel guitar, dobro
Dann Huff – electric guitar
John Barlow Jarvis – piano
Mary Ann Kennedy – background vocals
Mark Luna – background vocals
Brent Mason – electric guitar
Terry McMillan – congas, cymbals, tambourine
Don Potter – acoustic guitar
Michael Rhodes – bass guitar
Pam Rose – background vocals
Victoria Shaw – background vocals
Karen Staley – background vocals
Larry Stewart – background vocals
Cindy Richardson Walker – background vocals
Ron Wallace – background vocals
Lari White – background vocals
Lonnie Wilson – drums

On "Just Around the Eyes"
Gary Burr – background vocals
Jerry Douglas – dobro
Rob Hajacos – fiddle
Terry McMillan – percussion
Edgar Meyer – acoustic bass guitar
Harry Stinson – drums
Biff Watson – acoustic guitar
Glenn Worf – electric bass guitar

Production
Producers: Scott Hendricks (all tracks except "Just Around the Eyes"); Mike Clute and Gary Burr ("Just Around the Eyes" only)
Assistant producer: John Kunz
Engineers: Mike Clute, John Kelton
Assistant engineers: Jon "JD" Dickson, Amy Hughes, John Kunz, Shawn McLean, Wayne Morgan, Herb Tassin
Mixing: Scott Hendricks
Mastering: Denny Purcell
Overdubs: Scott Hendricks, John Kunz
Art direction: Laura LiPuma
Design: Garrett Rittenberry
Photography: Aaron Rapoport
Make-up: Eric Bernard, Beth Katz

Charts

Weekly charts

Year-end charts

Certifications

References

1993 debut albums
Faith Hill albums
Warner Records albums

it:Take Me as I Am